Ali Bolaghi (also Romanized as ‘Alī Bolāghī) is a village in Shenetal Rural District, Kuhsar District, Salmas County, West Azerbaijan Province, Iran. At the 2006 census, its population was 438, in 71 families.

References 

Populated places in Salmas County